Join the Marines is a 1937 American action film directed by Ralph Staub and written by Joseph Krumgold and Olive Cooper. The film stars Paul Kelly, June Travis, Purnell Pratt, Reginald Denny, Warren Hymer and Irving Pichel. It was released on January 25, 1937 by Republic Pictures.

Plot
New York policeman and Olympic javelin thrower Phil Donlan is on his way to the 1936 Olympic Games when he meets lovely Paula Denbrough on the ocean liner to Europe. Paula is planning to marry playboy Steve Lodge, but her father, a colonel with the  Marine Corps, uses his influence to prevent the marriage. Paula believes that Phil is at fault and exacts revenge by exaggerating some of Phil's pranks into a scandal that causes his expulsion from the Olympics team and later from the NYPD. Paula and Phil fall in love on the return trip, but Phil has no career prospects and wishes to impress Paula, so he joins the Marines. When Paula and Phil's romance ends, Phil declares that he will become an officer in order that he may resign his commission and leave the Marines.

Phil shows great physical strength and leadership qualities, and he is rapidly promoted to the rank of corporal, and later, the acting frst sergeant. He volunteers for duty in the South Seas and singlehandedly quashes a rebellion by challenging the natives to spear-throwing competitions that win their respect. When commissioned as a second lieutenant, Phil plans his resignation but faces a revolt by the natives, who do not respect Phil's replacement.

Cast
Paul Kelly as Philip H. "Phil" Donlan
June Travis as Paula Denbrough
Purnell Pratt as Col. J. B. Denbrough
Reginald Denny as Steve Lodge
Warren Hymer as Hoiman
Irving Pichel as Col. Leonard
Sterling Holloway as Alfred
Ray "Crash" Corrigan as Lt. Hodge
John Holland as Lieutenant
Carleton Young as Corporal
John Sheehan as O'Day
Arthur Hoyt as Capt. James
Richard Beach as Marine
Howard Hickman as Pruitt 
Val Duran as Chinese Bartender
Landers Stevens as Dr. McCullough

References

External links
 

1937 films
American action films
1930s action films
Republic Pictures films
American black-and-white films
Films directed by Ralph Staub
Films set in Oceania
Films about the United States Marine Corps
Films produced by Nat Levine
1930s English-language films
1930s American films